Clifton Township is one of nineteen townships in Ashe County, North Carolina, United States. The township had a population of 1,911 as of the 2010 census.

Clifton Township occupies  in central Ashe County. There are no incorporated municipalities located in Clifton Township, but there are several unincorporated communities, including Clifton, Comet, Fig, and Warrensville.

References

Townships in Ashe County, North Carolina
Townships in North Carolina